Ronnie Eriksson (born 22 April 1972) is a rugby union player who made three appearances for the Scotland national rugby union team. He played centre.

Early life
He was born in Athlone in Ireland. He was educated at Merchiston Castle School and played rugby there.

Rugby Union career

Amateur career

He played club rugby for London Scottish.

Provincial and professional career

Eriksson's career straddles the amateur and professional era. He played for Scottish Exiles and won the 1994–95 Scottish Inter-District Championship with the side.

London Scottish turned professional in 1995.

He also had a career with Harlequins

International career

Eriksson made his international debut against New Zealand at Dunedin as part of the 1996 Scotland tour.

His last appearance was against England at Twickenham in 1997. He had been selected for the 1998 Scotland rugby union tour of Oceania but withdrew because of injury.

References

1972 births
Living people
London Scottish F.C. players
People educated at Merchiston Castle School
Rugby union centres
Rugby union players from Athlone
Scotland international rugby union players
Scottish rugby union players